Campanology is the scientific and musical study of bells. It encompasses the technology of bellshow they are cast, tuned, and rungas well as the history, methods, and traditions of bellringing as an art. Articles related to campanology include:

A–C

D–F

G–I

J–L

M–O

P–R

S–U

V–Z

See also

 Index of music articles

 
Indexes of science articles
Music-related lists